Bubbles & Cheesecake was a U.S. Internet-based, multimedia collaboration between multi-disciplinary artist Allee Willis and singer-songwriter Holly Palmer. The name Bubbles & Cheesecake referred to Willis' and Palmer's respective alter-egos. They jointly published music, videos, art work, animation merchandise, online characters, stories and games online.

History

Bubbles & Cheesecake grew out of the songwriting partnership of Willis and Palmer, who were originally introduced in 2001 by music publisher Marla McNally. At first they came together to compose songs for Palmer's third solo album, I Confess. Their collaboration was interrupted when Willis left to co-write the music and lyrics for the Broadway production of The Color Purple. During that time, Palmer formed her own independent record label, Bombshell Records, and released "I Confess" in 2004. She also went on the road singing with the Gnarls Barkley live band.

In the 1990s, Willis developed willisville, an evolving prototype for the first sonic and visual interactive social network online. This merging of narrative frameworks and multiple technologies and platforms into a single cohesive environment was written up by Fortune', The Wall Street Journal, and The New York Times. It now serves as the archetype for Bubbles & Cheesecake. The website features artwork by Bubbles the artist, Willis' alter ego.

The idea of creative collaboration with an alter ego began when Willis started painting and making ceramics as Bubbles the artist in 1999. At the time, Willis told people that she had stumbled across Bubbles online and that she had decided to manage her career. The initial spin was that Bubbles was a "bad" artist and Willis' most significant discovery since the musical Del Rubio Triplets, but in reality, Bubbles ultimately sold close to 1,000 paintings and ceramic pieces to collectors including Lily Tomlin and Tracey Ullman. In May, 1999, The New York Times reported that "Bubbles the artist is Ms. Willis herself."  Although most people who collected Bubbles were in on the joke, Willis continued to deny her dual identity.

Palmer had recently been given the nickname "MC Cheesecake" by her husband while she was rhyming about food in the car one day. Palmer came up with the idea that Cheesecake should become Bubbles' protégé, paralleling her relationship as Willis'.

In 2006, the two resumed composing together at the multi-media studio at Willis' Los Angeles-area home, an art deco house known as "Willis Wonderland." They originally intended to write songs for what would be Palmer's fourth solo album, Songs For Tuesday. Released in 2007, Songs For Tuesday features the Willis-Palmer co-write "Girl In Lust," which, like "I Confess" from Holly's previous album, also was later recorded and performed by Bubbles & Cheesecake.

Instead of continuing to work on Palmer's solo album, however, Willis and Palmer were inspired to write, perform, and record together in full collaboration under the name Bubbles & Cheesecake. Their first official single and video as Bubbles & Cheesecake is It's A Woman Thang, which was introduced with the launch of their website in October 2007.

Allee Willis died in Los Angeles on December 24, 2019, at the age of 72. The cause of death was cardiac arrest.

Discography

EPs
 The Soul of Bubbles & Cheesecake EP (2007, Bubbles & Cheesecake Unlimited)

Songs
 It's A Woman Thang (Willis/Palmer)
 I Confess (Willis/Palmer/Blockland)
 Girl In Lust (Willis/Palmer)
 Cryin, Lovin, Leavin (Willis/Palmer/Dozier)

Music videos
 It's A Woman Thang''

See also
Allee Willis
Holly Palmer

References

External links
Official Bubbles & Cheesecake Site
Official Allee Willis Site
Official Bubbles the Artist Site
Official Holly Palmer Site

2001 establishments in California
Alternative rock groups from California
American artist groups and collectives
American musical duos
American soul musical groups
Grammy Award winners
Musical groups established in 2001
Songwriters from California